Knabstrup Manor is a manor house located near Holbæk on the Danish island of Zealand. It traces its history to before 1288.

History
Knabstrup is one of the oldest manor houses in Denmark. It is first mentioned in 1288 when it was confiscated from Niels Henriksen, a member of the Hvide dynasty, for his participation in the murder of Eric V in 1286.

Nothing is known about the earliest building but in 1460 Iver Axelsen Thott, who then owned the property, began constructing a complex similar to Lilø Manor in Scania which he also owned. 

The estate was acquired by Frederik Nielsen Parsberg after a fire had destroyed the main building in 1620 and he decided to rebuild it approximately 700 m from the location of the old site.

In 1776, the estate was sold on foreclosure and acquired by Christian Ditlev Lunn, a theologian who had turned to farming. After his death in 1812, the property was taken over by his son, Willars Knudsen Lunn, but slowly fell into a state of disrepair. It was finally decided to build a new main building, a project which was carried out by his son, Carl Frederik August, who had taken over management of the estate in 1846.

The project also included a brickyard and an oven was constructed from 1856 to 1859. 

The new main building was designed by Vilhelm Dahlerup, then a young, unknown architect but later a prominent figure in Danish architecture. Construction took place from 1861 to 1862.

Buildings
Knabstrup is a three-winged building in Historicist style. The east wing of the old building was incorporated in the new house but redesigned to fit the two other wings. Building materials were re-used as far as possible, and the main wing has Baroque doors in from the old manor house. The widow seat Dorotheaslyst was built from 1799 to 1802 by Philip Lange, the son of Philip de Lange, and is listed.

Horse breeding
The Danish horse breed Knabstrupper is named after the estate where it was bred by Major V. Lunn in the early 19th century.

Owners
pre-1259: The Crown 
1259–1375: Roskilde Bishop's seat 
1375–1436: The Crown
1436–1444: Poul Laxmand 
1444: Margrethe Poulsdatter Laxmand néeThott 
1444–1487: Iver Axelsen Thott 
1487: Beate Ivarsdatter Thott néeTrolle 
1487–1505: Arild Birger Trolle 
1505–1541: Jacob Trolle 
1541–1546: Else Poulsdatter Laxmand née Gyldensterine 
1546–1561: Gjørvel Abrahamsdatter Gyldenstierne (1) Ulfstand (2) Ulfstand 
1561–1681: Lisbeth Trolle néeSparre 
1681–1610: Gabriel Sparre 
1610–1622: Johan Sparre 
1622–1653: Frederik Parsberg 
1653–1662: Sophie Kaas néeParsberg 
1662–1672: Niels Frederiksen Parsberg / Jørgen Frederiksen Parsberg / Verner Frederiksen Parsberg 
1672–1685: Jørgen Frederiksen Parsberg 
1685: Assessor Sidenborg 
1685: Enke Fru Sidenborg 
1685–1695: Frederik Wittinghoff baron Scheel 
1695–1730: Schack baron Brockdorff 
1730–1732: Sophie Charlotte Scheel néeBrockdorff 
1732–1745: Maximilian Wilhelm von Dombroich 
1745–1747: Johan Lorentz Castenschiold 
1747–1760: The estate after Johan Lorentz Castenschiold 
1760–1764: Carl Adolph Castenschiold 
1764–1770: Jørgen Jørgensen 
1770–1772: Enke Fru Jørgensen née von Hielmcrone 
1772–1776: Jørgen von Hielmcrone 
1776–1814: Christian Ditlev Lunn 
1814–1865: Willars Knudsen Lunn 
1865–1886: Carl Frederik August Willarsen Lunn 
1886–1929: Erasmus Sigismund Lunn 
1929–1931: Knud William Lunn 
1931–1960: Knabstrup Gods A/S v/a Kurator Knud William Lunn 
1960–1980: Knabstrup Gods A/S v/a Kurator Bodil Lunn 
1980–2007: Knabstrup Gods A/S v/s Kurator Gerda Lunn Gram 
2008-present: Knbstrup Gods A/S v/s Kurator Gorm Lunn

References

Historicist architecture in Denmark
Listed buildings and structures in Holbæk Municipality
Manor houses in Holbæk Municipality
Timber framed buildings in Holbæk Municipality
Houses completed in 1862
Buildings and structures associated with the Parsberg family
Buildings and structures associated with the Castenschiold family
Vilhelm Dahlerup buildings
1862 establishments in Denmark